Franco Gabelli better known by his stage name Frank Michael is a Belgian singer of Italian origin born in Parma, Italy on 7 May 1947. He reportedly sold millions of albums throughout the world.

At age of three, Franco's family left Italy and resided in Seraing, province of Liège, Belgium. At age 16, he started working television electronics technician. His singing career was launched with the 1974 single "Je ne peux vivre sans toi" released on RCA. He was popular in  live concerts and released a big number of albums that charted in France and Belgium. His best songs came from collaboration with Michel Mallory, although he worked with many other songwriters as well.

In 2003, he also released a homage album entitled Thank You Elvis with 15 tracks of Elvis Presley in French and Italian. He remains popular particularly with the older generations. In 2004, he received the Belgian Order of the Crown.

Discography

Albums

Singles

References

External links
Official website

Belgian male singers
Officers of the Order of the Crown (Belgium)
1953 births
Living people
People from Seraing
Italian emigrants to Belgium
Walloon musicians